"Allah Lanjutkan Usia Sultan" ("God Lengthen the Sultan's Age") is the state anthem of Perak, Malaysia.

The tune was originally that of 'La Rosalie', a popular song in Seychelles during the 19th century, originally written by French composer Pierre Jean de Beranger. It was adopted as the Perak Royal Anthem by Sultan Abdullah Muhammad Shah II, who was exiled on Seychelles for abetting murder.

In 1957, the national anthem of Malaysia, "Negaraku" was set to the melody of "Allah Lanjutkan Usia Sultan".

Lyrics

References

Notes

External links
  Perak State Anthem (From the Official Webpage of the Office of the Sultan of Perak)

Perak
Anthems of Malaysia